Villalobosius is a genus of crabs in the family Pseudothelphusidae, containing a single species, Villalobosius lopezformenti. It lives in the northern part of the state of Oaxaca, Mexico, on the Isthmus of Tehuantepec, and is adapted to a troglobitic lifestyle.

Nomenclature
The species was originally described as Stygothelphusa lopezformenti in 1991, but the genus name Stygothelphusa was discovered to be a junior homonym of Stygothelphusa Ng, 1989, and a replacement name, Villalobosus, was created in 2000. This was also found to be a junior homonym, of the subgenus Villalobosus Holthuis, 1972 in the crayfish genus Procambarus, and so it, too, was replaced. The genus is therefore currently known as Villalobosius.

References

External links

Pseudothelphusidae
Freshwater crustaceans of North America
Fauna of Southern Mexico
Monotypic arthropod genera